Eyeshade or eye shade may refer to:
Cosmetic products which may be applied to the upper eyelid and to the area near the eye to change skin coloration. See eye shadow.
Blindfolds, such as a sleep-mask
Visors, surfaces that protects the eyes, such as shading them from the sun.
Green eyeshade, an iconic form of type popular in the late 19th and early 20th century